Jenjan may refer to:
 Gardaneh-ye Jenjan
 Jenjan-e Markazi